International Management Institute may refer to:

 International Management Institute, Bhubaneswar
 International Management Institute, New Delhi
 International Management Institute, Geneva, now International Institute for Management Development
  International Management Institute, Kolkata
 International Management Institute, Kalaidos University of Applied Sciences
 International Management Institute of Saint Petersburg
 International Management Institute, Zurich University of Applied Sciences
 International Institute for Management Development, Lausanne, Switzerland

See also  
 IMI (disambiguation)